Jusuf Gërvalla (October 1, 1943 – January 17, 1982) was a Kosovo Albanian activist, writer, musician, Marxist-Leninist and the founder of the group called National Movement for the Liberation of Kosovo.

Biography
Born in the village Burrëmadh (Dubovik), in the municipality of Dečan in Yugoslavia, Gërvalla pursued a college education in Prishtina and Ljubljana before working as a journalist in Skopje and Prishtina. A vocal nationalist, he came under the radar of Yugoslav secret service, prompting him to seek asylum in Germany in 1980 where he subsequently established the Popular Movement for the Republic of Kosovo, which later split into the two factions the People's Movement of Kosovo and the National Movement for the Liberation of Kosovo, the former being the forerunners of the, at the time, ideologically heterogeneous Kosovo Liberation Army. While abroad, he also made efforts to unite Albanian movements and political parties. On January 17, 1982, Gërvalla along with his brother Bardhosh Gërvalla, and fellow activist Kadri Zeka, were assassinated in Stuttgart, allegedly by Yugoslav secret service. His murder caused outrage among Albanians and abroad, and led to an increased intensity in Albanian nationalism and hostility to Yugoslav control of Kosovo.

Some of his literary publications include Fluturojnë e bien ("They Fly and Fall"), Kanjushë e verdhë ("Green Stork") and Rrotull ("Around"). Gërvalla's daughter Donika Gërvalla-Schwarz is a politician in Kosovo, serving as minister of foreign affairs and second deputy prime minister in the second Kurti cabinet since 2021.

References

1943 births
1982 deaths
Kosovo Albanians
Albanian activists
Assassinated Yugoslav people
Assassinated Albanian journalists
Male musicians
Yugoslav Marxists
Albanian human rights activists
Albanian nationalists in Kosovo
1982 murders in Germany
20th-century male musicians